GQ is an American monthly men's magazine.

GQ, Gq or gq may also refer to:

Arts and media
 GQ (actor) (Gregory J. Qaiyum), American actor
 GQ (band), a 1970s American disco group
 GQ (Indian edition), the Indian edition of the American magazine
 The German Quarterly, an American journal of German studies
 GQ, an American barbershop music group also known as Girls Quartet

Science and mathematics
 Gq alpha subunit, a class of proteins
 Generalized quadrangle, a type of incidence structure in mathematics
 Generalized quantifier, a type of expression in linguistic semantics

Other
 Equatorial Guinea (ISO 3166 code)
 .gq, the country code top-level domain for Equatorial Guinea
 GQ, ICAO code prefix for airports in Mauritania
 Genderqueer, a gender identity other than man or woman
 General quarters, a call to battle stations aboard a naval warship
 Golden Quadrilateral, a highway network in India

See also
 GQ Lupi and GQ Muscae, stars
 GQview, a free software image viewer